Galium kamtschaticum, known as Kamchatka bedstraw or boreal bedstraw, is a plant species in the Rubiaceae, named for the Kamchatka Peninsula on the Pacific Coast of Russia. The species is native to northeastern Asia and northern North America: Russia (Kamchatka, Sakhalin Island, and Kuril Islands), northeastern China (Heilongjiang, Jilin), Korea, Japan, Alaska (including the Aleutians), Canada (Yukon, Northwest Territories, British Columbia, Quebec, Ontario, Newfoundland, Nova Scotia, New Brunswick), and the northern part of the contiguous United States (Maine, New Hampshire, Vermont, New York, Michigan, Washington).

Varieties
Two varieties are recognized:

Galium kamtschaticum var. kamtschaticum - most of species range
Galium kamtschaticum var. yakusimense (Masam.) T.Yamaz - indigenous to Yakushima Island in southern Japan

References

External links
Maine Department of Agriculture Conservation and Forestry, Galium kamtschaticum 
Go Botany, New England Wildflower Society, Galium kamtschaticum 
Gardening Europe

kamtschaticum
Flora of the Russian Far East
Flora of the Northeastern United States
Flora of Subarctic America
Flora of Eastern Canada
Flora of Washington (state)
Flora of Heilongjiang
Flora of Jilin
Flora of Korea
Flora of Japan
Flora of British Columbia
Plants described in 1827
Flora without expected TNC conservation status